Radio Sessions 1974 & 1978 is a double live album by Welsh rock band Budgie. The album tracks were taken from two live concerts; one at the Global Village in London in 1974, the other in Los Angeles in 1978.

Track listing

Personnel

London, 1974
Budgie
Burke Shelley - bass & vocals
Tony Bourge - guitar
Pete Boot - drums

Los Angeles, 1978
Budgie
Burke Shelley - bass, vocals
Tony Bourge - guitar
Myfyr Isaac - guitar
Steve Williams - drums

References

Budgie (band) live albums
2005 live albums
BBC Radio recordings